The Special Library of Oncology is a central oncological library in Slovenia. It was established as an Information and Documentation Center of the Institute of Oncology Ljubljana in early 1950s.

The users of the library are physicians and other health professionals of the Institute as well as of other medical institutions, students of medicine, and also other libraries in Slovenia and abroad. Professional users can access the latest published scientific and professional literature to cater for their everyday needs.

The library is an active member of the Slovenian bibliographic cataloging system.

See also 
 COBISS , Co-operative Online Bibliographic System & Services

References

External links 
 Official website Special Library of Oncology . www.onko-i.si. Retrieved 2018-03-14
 Official website Institute of Oncology Ljubljana . www.onko-i.si. Retrieved 2018-03-14

Medical libraries